Lecitholaxa zopheropis is a moth in the family Lecithoceridae. It was described by Edward Meyrick in 1931. It is found in Sikkim, India.

The wingspan is about 16 mm. The forewings are grey suffusedly irrorated (sprinkled) with dark purplish fuscous. The discal stigmata are represented by cloudy spots of darker suffusions. The hindwings are grey.

References

Moths described in 1931
Lecitholaxa
Moths of Asia